St. George Township is a township in Benton County, Minnesota, United States. The population was 1,153 as of the 2010 census.

History
St. George Township was organized in 1858. It was named for three early settlers who all had the first name George.

Geography

Major highways
  Minnesota State Highway 23
  Minnesota State Highway 25
  Minnesota State Highway 95

Adjacent townships
 Gilmanton (north)
 Glendorado (east)
 Santiago, Sherburne County (southeast)
 Palmer, Sherburne County (south)
 Haven, Sherburne County (southwest)
 Minden (west)
 Mayhew Lake (northwest)

Demographics
The population density was 25.2 people per square mile (9.7/km). There were 317 housing units at an average density of 8.6/sq mi (3.3/km). The racial makeup of the township was 99.24% White, 0.32% Native American, 0.11% Asian, 0.22% Pacific Islander, and 0.11% from two or more races.

There were 312 households, out of which 41.0% had children under the age of 18 living with them, 72.1% were married couples living together, 5.8% had a female householder with no husband present, and 18.9% were non-families. 15.1% of all households were made up of individuals, and 7.1% had someone living alone who was 65 years of age or older.  The average household size was 2.96 and the average family size was 3.28.

In the township the population was spread out, with 29.5% under the age of 18, 8.2% from 18 to 24, 27.6% from 25 to 44, 23.7% from 45 to 64, and 10.9% who were 65 years of age or older.  The median age was 34 years. For every 100 females, there were 112.4 males.  For every 100 females age 18 and over, there were 111.4 males.

The median income for a household in the township was $50,694, and the median income for a family was $53,750. Males had a median income of $31,528 versus $24,167 for females. The per capita income for the township was $20,857.  About 3.0% of families and 4.8% of the population were below the poverty line, including 9.4% of those under age 18 and 6.5% of those age 65 or over.

References
 United States National Atlas
 United States Census Bureau 2007 TIGER/Line Shapefiles
 United States Board on Geographic Names (GNIS)

Townships in Benton County, Minnesota
St. Cloud, Minnesota metropolitan area
Townships in Minnesota